Petr Asayonak (born 27 February 1993) is a Belarusian Olympic weightlifter. He qualified for 2016 Summer Olympics.

Results

References

External links 
 
 
 

1993 births
Living people
Belarusian male weightlifters
Weightlifters at the 2016 Summer Olympics
Olympic weightlifters of Belarus
European Weightlifting Championships medalists